Jim Page (born 1949) is an American folk singer-songwriter and social activist.

Early life

Page was born in Palo Alto, California in 1949 and moved to Seattle in 1971.

Music career and activism

He is known for his political songs and for his activism in support of buskers. He is one of the organizers of Buskerfest in Seattle. He frequently appears with Artis the Spoonman. He tours internationally, yet he still plays at Pike Place Market as a street performer.

Page began playing guitar at age 15.

In 1974, his protest song and testimony convinced the Seattle City Council to drop the requirement that street performers have a permit to perform.

Notable work 
Page is well known in coffee houses and folk clubs in Seattle and the northwest, as well as in Britain and Ireland, where he toured for several years. His best known songs include "Fireside", his first song, written in 1967, Hiroshima Nagasaki Russian Roulette", an anti-nuclear weapons song from his 1976 album "On the Street Again", later covered by Moving Hearts and  Christy Moore, "On the Street Again", "Time Enough for Questions When the Killing's Done", about the eternal quest for a 'man of honor', "Cultus Bay Serenade", "Miles and Miles", about the modernization of the San Francisco Bay Area, "Anna Mae", "An Old Pair of Red Shoes", and "Gasworks Park".
He has also questioned US involvement in the Iraq war

Discography
A Shot of the Usual – Whid-Isle Records, LP, 1975
On the Street Again – Whid-Isle Records, LP, 1976
Hot Times – Whid-Isle Records, LP, 1979
In the Act – First American Records, LP, 1980
This Movie Is For Real – Nacksving, LP, 1982
Visions in My View – Flying Fish, LP, 1986
More Than Anything Else in the World, 1993
Jim Page & Artis: On The Street Sidewalk Again, cassette, 1994
Whose World Is This, 1997
Heroes and Survivors, 1997
Gettin Squeezed, 1999
Music From Big Red, 2001
Collateral Damage, 2002
Human Interesting – A Temporary Retrospective, 2002
Seattle Songs, 2004
Head Full of Pictures, 2006
Jim Page & Artis: After All This Time, 2007
I See What You Mean – Jim Page in Nashville, 2007
Ghost Bikes, 2010
A Hand Full Of Songs, 2017
Pretty Simple, 2020
The Time is Now, 2022

References

External links

Official homepage

Musicians from Seattle
1949 births
Living people
American folk singers
Singer-songwriters from Washington (state)
Political music artists